The Sex Files is a television program appearing on Discovery Channel Canada and shown on CTVglobemedia around midnight hours, because of content. It talks about several issues of sexuality, from genetics, reproduction, sexual orientation, puberty, etc. It does contain nudity, which is why it is shown in the midnight hours, but the nudity is done from a scientific point of view showing exactly what the topic is visually, good for people who want information on sexuality and the biology behind it. In Europe the show was called Sex Sense and featured a male narrator. The number of episodes and their titles were the same, but the episodes themselves were slightly different as the more explicit scenes were replaced. It aired on Discovery Channel Europe.

Starting with episode 41 (season 4), it is broadcast in high-definition.

The Sex Files episode list

Season 1
 The Erection
 Breasts
 Orgasm
 The Birds and the Bees
 Aphrodisiacs
 Fantasy
 The Affair
 Fetish
 Gender
 Hair
 What is Sexy?
 Girl Power
 Birth Control

Season 2
 Sex Drive
 The Act
 The Vagina
 Sexual Signals
 Sexual Senses
 Sex for One
 Puberty
 Homosexuality
 The Rear End
 Sexual Cycle
 Love Juices
 Circumcision
 Intersexed People
 Myths

Season 3
 Testicles
 Celibacy
 Behavioral addiction
 Better Sex
 Sexual Reconstruction
 Menopause
 Future Sex
 Sex & Culture
 Sex & Disabilities
 Sex vs. Love
 Healing Sex
 Pregnancy
 Sexpertise

Season 4
 Sex Toys
 Kinky Sex
 Rated X
 Beyond Monogamy
 Pleasure and Pain
 The Kiss
 The Strip
 The Bi Way
 Baring it All
 No Sex Please
 Dirty Jokes
 Makin' it Work
 More Kinky Sex

Season 5
 First Date
 Sun, Sand and Sex
 The Boob Tube
 Top Ten Sexiest Clothes
 The Love Glove
 Top Ten Sexy Things
 Sexercise
 Top Ten Sexual Fantasies
 Erotic Origins
 His Sexy Makeover
 Her Sexy Makeover
 The Wedding
 Making of the Sex Files

Season 6
 Virginity
 Marriage Makeover
 The Brothel
 Breasts
 Sex and Beauty
 Girls on Top
 Sex and Aging
 Top Ten Myths
 Touch
 Sex and Rock n' Roll
 Satisfaction
 Top Ten Archetypes
 Sextracurricular Activities

Sexual Secrets
Sexual Secrets uses footage from The Sex Files, with contents rearranged to 1-hour episodes. Sexual Secrets was premiered on Life Network and Discovery Health. Episodes 1-18 use footage from first three seasons of The Sex Files. High-definition episodes are available starting with episode 19, which corresponds to the fourth and later seasons of The Sex Files.

Sexual Secrets episode list

 Pleasure Zones (09/27/2002)
 Love Potions (10/04/2002)
 Sex Appeal (09/20/2002)to 
 Sex Drive (09/27/2002)
 Forbidden Fruit (10/04/2002)
 The Mating Game (11/21/2003)
 Love Juices (10/18/2002)
 Doing It Right (11/01/2002)
 Love Triangles (11/08/2002)
 The Body Beautiful (11/08/2002)
 Sex 101 (04/25/2003)
 Cheeky Secrets (04/25/2003)
 Ultimate Sex (04/11/2003)
 Sex, Lies and Abstinence
 Constant Cravings (05/02/2003)
 Designer Sex (05/16/2003)
 Sexpecting (05/23/2003)
 Prescription: Sex (05/30/2003)
 Bi Now, Tri Later
 Dating Secrets (03/05/2005)
 Wild and Whipped
 Kinky Secrets
 Ultimate Makeover
 Adults Only
 Beach Bums
 Ultimate Sex List (12/31/2004)
 Under the Hood, and down the drain.
 Put It On, Turn It On (02/26/2005)
 Sex Ed for Grownups (04/14/2006)
 Sex, Lies and Myth (04/21/2006)
 Aged to Satisfaction (04/28/2006)
 Rock n’ Roll in the Hay (5/05/2006)
 Alpha Dames: Sex, Sass and Secrets (05/12/2006)
 Beauty and the Breast (5/19/2006)
 Pure and not so Simple (05/26/2006)
 Sexy Marriage Makeover: From Hot to Not (06/02/2006)

External links
 

Sex Files, The
Discovery Channel (Canada) original programming